The Persian journal Ayandeh (Persian: آینده; DMG: Āyandeh; English: "Future") was founded in Tehran by Mahmud Afshar (1893–1983) in 1925. The monthly journal was published in three issues with 46 numbers in total. The first number goes from June 1925 to March 1928 (24 issues), the second from October 1944 to March 1945 (16 issues) and the third from October 1959 to April 1960 (6 issues). The editor Afshar, who studied political science in Switzerland, wanted to disseminate the Persian language as well as the idea of Iran's national unity in his politically and culturally oriented journal. Articles and poems by over 90 authors took up historical and contemporary topics from politics, economy, education and culture. Seyyed Hasan Taghizade, editor of the journal Kaveh (1916–1922) was among the well-known authors, as was Hoseyn Kazemzadeh-Iranshahr, editor of the journal Iranshahr (1922–1927). Up-to-date, historically relevant political documents as well as pictures of renowned politicians and translations of European literature were also published. Due to countless acts of censorship against the press, Ayandeh probably had to be discontinued in 1960. After the Iranian revolution in 1979, Īraǧ Afšār (1925–2011), the son of Mahmud Afshar, republished the journal, now with a more scientific focus, until 1994.

References

Further reading
 Keivandokht Ghahari (2001): Nationalismus und Modernismus im Iran in der Periode zwischen dem Zerfall der Qāǧāren-Dynastie und der Machtfestigung Reża Schahs. Eine Untersuchung über die intellektuellen Kreise um die Zeitschriften Kāweh, Īrānšahr und Āyandeh, Berlin.

1925 establishments in Iran
1960 disestablishments in Iran
Cultural magazines
Defunct magazines published in Iran
Defunct political magazines
Monthly magazines published in Iran
Magazines published in Tehran
Magazines established in 1925
Magazines disestablished in 1960
Persian-language magazines